The 2010 Men's World Open Squash Championship is the men's edition of the 2010 World Open, which serves as the individual world championship for squash players. The event took place at the Sunset Beach Resort in Khobar, Saudi Arabia from 2 to 10 December 2010. Nick Matthew won his first World Open title, defeating James Willstrop in the final.

Prize money and ranking points
For 2010, the prize purse was $327,500. The prize money and points breakdown is as follows:

Seeds

Draw and results

Finals

Top half

Section 1

Section 2

Bottom half

Section 1

Section 2

See also
World Open
2010 Women's World Open Squash Championship

References

External links
World Open 2010 official website

World Squash Championships
2010 PSA World Tour
M
Men's World Open Squash
Squash in Saudi Arabia
Squash tournaments in Saudi Arabia
International sports competitions hosted by Saudi Arabia